The Body in Question is a British-based, internationally co-produced medical television series first aired in the UK in November 1978.

Premise
This is a 13-part series (1 hour episodes) on all aspects of medicine and health science, written and presented by Dr Jonathan Miller.

Miller considers the functioning of the body as a subject of private experience. He explores our attitudes towards our bodies, our ignorance of them, and our inability to read our body's signals.  The first episode starts with vox populi asking where various organs in the body are located.  By the final episode we are left in no doubt, as the show became the first in television history to depict the dissection of a human cadaver (i.e. post-mortem examination or autopsy).

Taking as his starting point the experience of pain, Dr. Miller analyses the elaborate social process of "falling ill", considers the physical foundations of "disease" and looks at the types of individuals humankind has historically attributed with the power of healing.  The series was nominated for two 1979 BAFTAs: Best Factual Television Series and Most Original Programme/Series.

Production
The series was primarily produced by the BBC, with international co-production support from the Australian Broadcasting Corporation, CBC Television, Ontario Educational Communications Authority, and KCET-TV.

Scheduling
This hour-long series was first aired by the BBC on 6 November 1978. It was first broadcast in Canada on CBC Television Mondays at 11:45 p.m. (Eastern time) from 26 February to 28 May 1979. It was rebroadcast on CBC in mid-1981 (3 June to 2 September).

Episodes
 Naming of Parts
 Try a Little Tenderness
 How Do You Feel?
 Breathless
 Blood Relations
 Heart of the Matter
 Shaping the Future
 Sleight of Hand
 Native Medicine
 Balancing Act
 Brute Machine
 Heads and Tails
 Perishable Goods

Production team
This list is extracted from the ending credits of all the shows:

 Lighting Cameraman: Ken Lowe
 Rostrum Camera: Ivor Richardson
 Camera Operator: Tony Mayne
 Sound Recordists: Martyn Clift, Barrie Tharby
 Dubbing Mixer: Stan Morcom
 Film Editor: Simon Hammond, Pauline Dykes
 Music: Peter Howell (BBC Radiophonic Workshop)
 Research: Jon Palfreman, Jane Callandar
 Graphic Design: Charles McGhie, Barbra Flinder
 Design: Colin Lowrey
 Production Assistant: Fisher Dilke, John Palfreman
 Production Team: Mary Phelps, Pamela Smith, Avril Stewart
 Assistant Producer: Jonathan Crane
 Executive Producer: Karl Sabbagh
 Producer: Patrick Uden

Music release
A three track single of Peter Howell's music from this single was released on 7" vinyl in 1981. These tracks were issued as bonus tracks in the Record Store Day exclusive 6-CD box set Four Albums 1968 - 1978 29 August 2020.

References

External links
 
 
 

1978 British television series debuts
1979 British television series endings
1970s British medical television series
1970s Canadian documentary television series
1979 Canadian television series debuts
1979 Canadian television series endings
Australian Broadcasting Corporation original programming
BBC Television shows
British medical television series
Canadian medical television series
CBC Television original programming
PBS original programming
TVO original programming
1970s British documentary television series